Ben Blushi (born 1 January 1969) is an Albanian politician, writer and journalist.

Biography
Ben Blushi, born in Tirana, studied at the University of Tirana, graduating in Albanian language and literature. He was editor-in-chief of the newspaper Koha Jonë. His works deal with Albanian history and contemporary Albania. In April 2008, Ben Blushi published his first novel Të jetosh në ishull (Living on an Island). Within a couple of months, the book had sold over 30,000 copies, a record for the Albanian market. The novel covers Albanian history under the Ottoman Empire (15th–18th centuries), with a broad and not uncontroversial treatment of the country's Islamization. His second novel, Othello, The Moor of Vlora won the European Union Prize for Literature in 2014. His following novels The Candidate  and The Prime Minister were the best selling books at the Tirana Book Fair in 2015 and 2016 respectively. 
Blushi is an atheist.

Political career
In 1999 Blushi embarked upon a political career in the cabinet of Prime Minister Fatos Nano. For several months he served as Deputy Minister of Foreign Affairs, and in late 2000 he became Prefect of Korça. He served as Minister of Education and Minister of Local Governance and Decentralization.

Blushi was a Member of Parliament for the Socialist Party before creating a new party, LIBRA, in October 2016. Subsequently, he was an MP for LIBRA but he failed to win his seat in the 2017 election.  In January 2018 he quit the party and politics and became the general director of the Top Channel with a wage that surpasses many   of his european  colleagues.

Novels
 Të Jetosh Në Ishull. Toena, Tirana 2008 
 Otello, Arapi i Vlorës. Toena, Tirana 2009 
 Shqipëria. Mapo Editions, Tirana 2011. 
 Kandidati. UET, Tirana 2015
 KM: Kryeministri. Mapo Editions, Tirana 2016

Essays
 Hëna e Shqipërisë. UET, Tirana 2014.

Awards and honours
 European Union Prize for Literature, Albania, Otello, Arapi i Vlorës (Othello, the Moor of Vlora)

References

1969 births
Living people
Albanian atheists
People from Tirana
Members of the Parliament of Albania
Political party leaders of Albania
University of Tirana alumni
Albanian novelists
21st-century Albanian politicians
Government ministers of Albania
Education ministers of Albania